Vail Winfred Jewell (May 11, 1910 – September 23, 1989) was an American Negro league second baseman in the 1930s.

A native of Paris, Missouri, Jewell played for the \ in 1937. He died in St. Louis, Missouri in 1989 at age 79.

References

External links
 and Seamheads

1910 births
1989 deaths
St. Louis Stars (1937) players
20th-century African-American sportspeople